Yashu Sharma (born 19 September 1998) is an Indian cricketer. He made his Twenty20 debut for Haryana in the 2018–19 Syed Mushtaq Ali Trophy on 28 February 2019. He made his List A debut on 10 October 2019, for Haryana in the 2019–20 Vijay Hazare Trophy. He made his first-class debut on 12 February 2020, for Haryana in the 2019–20 Ranji Trophy.

References

External links
 

1998 births
Living people
Indian cricketers
Haryana cricketers
Place of birth missing (living people)